Louis Agassiz (1807–1873) was a Swiss-born American biologist and geologist who is recognized as a scholar of Earth's natural history.

Agassiz may also refer to:

People
Other members of the Agassiz family, including:
Elizabeth Cabot Agassiz (1822–1907), American educator and naturalist, wife of Louis
Alexander Agassiz (1835–1910), American scientist and engineer, son of Louis and Elizabeth
 Rodolphe L. Agassiz (1871-1933), polo champion, son of Alexander
Graham Agassiz (born 1990), Canadian mountain biker

Places

Landforms
Lake Agassiz, a prehistoric glacial lake in North America
Agassiz Glacier (Alaska), U.S.
Agassiz Glacier (Montana), U.S.
Agassiz Glacier (New Zealand)
Agassiz Ice Cap, on Ellesmere Island, Nunavut, Canada
Agassiz Peak, in Arizona, U.S.
Agassiz Rock, a park in Massachusetts, U.S.
Mount Agassiz (California), U.S.
Mount Agassiz (Utah), U.S.
Agassizhorn, in Switzerland
Agassiz (crater), on Mars

Communities
 Agassiz, British Columbia, Canada
 Agassiz station (British Columbia), a railway station 
 Agassiz, Cambridge, Massachusetts, U.S.
 Agassiz Township, Lac qui Parle County, Minnesota, U.S.
 Agassiz Wilderness, in Minnesota, US
 Agassiz National Wildlife Refuge in Minnesota, US
 Agassiz (electoral district), in Manitoba, Canada

Other uses
 Agassiz Brewing Company, a Canadian brewery named for the prehistoric lake
 Agassiz School, a historic building in Ottumwa, Iowa, U.S.
 Agassiz Station, now Oak Ridge Observatory, in Massachusetts, U.S.
 Hotel Agassiz, a historic building in Boston, Massachusetts, U.S.
 , a ship of the Royal Canadian Navy
 , a ship of the United States Navy
 USCGC Agassiz (WSC-126), a ship of the United States Coast Guard

See also

Agassi, a surname
Gopherus agassizii, the desert tortoise
Agassiz's perchlet, a fish 
Anolis agassizi, a lizard 
Agassizia, a genus of sea urchin 
Agassiceras, a Lower Jurassic ammonite 

Franco-Provençal-language surnames